Leva is a genus of grasshoppers in the subfamily Gomphocerinae with species found in Africa and Asia.

Species 
The following species are recognised in the genus Leva:
 Leva aethiopica Bolívar, 1922
 Leva arabica (Uvarov, 1936)
 Leva astipta Jago, 1996
 Leva burmana Jago, 1996
 Leva callosa Uvarov, 1922
 Leva guichardi Jago, 1996
 Leva hackeri Ingrisch, 1999
 Leva hemiptera (Uvarov, 1952)
 Leva incilicula Jago, 1996
 Leva indica (Bolívar, 1902) - type species
 Leva jordanica (Uvarov, 1933)
 Leva magna Jago, 1996
 Leva nicholai Baccetti, 1985
 Leva obtusa Ingrisch, 1999
 Leva paraindica Jago, 1996
 Leva perexigua Jago, 1996
 Leva popovi Jago, 1996
 Leva soluta Bolívar, 1914
 Leva soudanica Descamps, 1965
 Leva striolifrons Jago, 1996

References 

Acrididae